The 2022 United States House of Representatives election in South Dakota was held on November 8, 2022, to elect the U.S. Representative from . The election coincided with other elections to the House of Representatives, elections to the United States Senate and various state and local elections.

Incumbent Republican Dusty Johnson was re-elected with 81.0% of the vote in 2020. Johnson defeated state representative Taffy Howard in the Republican primary. No Democratic candidate appeared on the ballot, Johnson's only general election opponent was Libertarian Collin Duprel.

Republican primary

Candidates

Nominee
Dusty Johnson, incumbent U.S. Representative

Eliminated in primary
Taffy Howard, state representative from the 33rd district

Polling

Primary results

Libertarian convention

Candidates

Nominee
Collin Duprel, cattle rancher

Democratic primary
Ryan Ryder dropped out of the race after past tweets of his were exposed with subject matter including Ryder fantastizing about killing Johnson's family and that he masturbated to a photo of Governor Kristi Noem.

Candidates

Withdrew
Ryan Ryder, lawyer

Declined
Troy Heinert, Minority Leader of the South Dakota Senate

General election

Predictions

Polling

Results

Notes

References

External links
Official campaign websites
Collin Duprel (L) for Congress
Dusty Johnson (R) for Congress

2022
South Dakota
United States House of Representatives